Lazzaro Vasari (1399–1468), also known as Lazzaro Taldi and as Lazzaro di Niccolò de' Taldi, was an Italian painter who was born in the Province of Arezzo.  His father was a potter, as was Lazzaro Vasari’s son, Giorgio Vasari I.  The painter Luca Signorelli (1441–1523) was Lazzaro Vasari’s nephew, and the art historian Giorgio Vasari was his great-grandson.

Lazzaro Vasari’s best-known work is the fresco of Saint Vincent Ferrer in the Basilica of San Domenico in Arezzo, Italy.  He died in Arezzo in 1468 and was buried at the Chapel of San Giorgio in the same city.

References 

 Bénézit, Emmanuel, ed., Dictionnaire critique et documentaire des Peintres, Sculpteurs, Dessinateurs et Graveurs. Originally published 1911-1923, Paris, Librairie Gründ, 1976.
 Thieme, Ulrich and Felix Becker, editors, Allgemeines Lexikon der bildenden Künstler von der Antike bis zur Gegenwart. Reprint of 1907 edition, Leipzig, Veb E.A. Seemann Verlag, 1980-1986.
 Vasari, Giorgio, Le Vite delle più eccellenti pittori, scultori, ed architettori, many editions and translations.

15th-century Italian painters
Italian male painters
Painters from Tuscany
1399 births
1468 deaths